Major-General Michael Forrester CB CBE DSO & Bar MC & Bar (31 August 1917 – 15 October 2006) was a British Army officer who served with distinction in World War II and later commanded the 4th Division.

Early life and military career
Educated at Haileybury, Forrester was commissioned into the Queen's Royal Regiment (West Surrey) in 1938 and, serving with the 2nd Battalion of his regiment, then commanded by Lieutenant Colonel Robert Ross, took part in the response to the Arab revolt in Palestine in 1939.

World War II
He served in World War II in Greece and in the Western Desert before becoming Commanding Officer of the 1/6th Battalion, Queen's Royal Regiment in 1943; in that role he secured the key bridge at Scafati in Italy and then took part in the Normandy landings before being wounded there in October 1944.

Postwar
He was appointed CO of the 2nd Battalion, Parachute Regiment and served in Cyprus and Egypt during 1951 and 1952. He was made Director of Staff at the Staff College, Camberley in 1953, a General Staff Officer at General Headquarters East Africa in 1955 during the Mau Mau Uprising and Commanding Officer of 3rd Battalion, Parachute Regiment in 1957. He went on to be Colonel, Military Operations at the War Office in 1960, Commander of 16th Parachute Brigade Group in 1961 and General Officer Commanding 4th Division in Germany in 1965. His last appointment was as Director of Infantry at the Ministry of Defence in 1968 before he retired in 1970.

Family
In 1947 he married Pauline Fisher (the marriage was dissolved in 1960); they had two sons.

References

External links
British Army Officers 1939−1945
Imperial War Museum Interview

1917 births
2006 deaths
Academics of the Staff College, Camberley
Graduates of the Royal College of Defence Studies
British Army major generals
British Army personnel of World War II
British military personnel of the 1936–1939 Arab revolt in Palestine
British military personnel of the Mau Mau Uprising
British Parachute Regiment officers
Companions of the Distinguished Service Order
Companions of the Order of the Bath
Commanders of the Order of the British Empire
People educated at Haileybury and Imperial Service College
Military personnel from Portsmouth
Queen's Royal Regiment officers
Recipients of the Military Cross